Stranded is a 1916 American silent drama film produced by Fine Arts Film Company and distributed by Triangle Film Corporation. The film stars DeWolf Hopper with newcomer Bessie Love in a supporting role. The film is considered lost.

Plot 

H. Ulysses Watts (Hopper) is a traveling Shakespearean actor whose career is on the decline, as his audiences are more interested in cinema and vaudeville. When the troupe is robbed by Stoner (Stockdale), Watts cares for an injured young trapeze artist (Love), and pretends to be her father so that he can protect her.

While healing in the village, the girl falls in love with a hotel manager, and they plan to marry. However, Stoner returns and threatens to reveal her true career and that she and Watts are not related. Instead, Watts tells all of this to the hotel manager, who is still in love with the girl and wants to marry her. At the wedding, Stoner fatally shoots Watts, who performs the death scene from Julius Caesar as his final performance. Stoner is captured, and the girl and her new husband live happily ever after.

Cast 
 DeWolf Hopper as H. Ulysses Watts
 Carl Stockdale as Stoner
 Frank Bennett as Hotel Proprietor
 Loyola O'Connor as His Mother
 Bessie Love as The Girl

Reception 

The film was positively received, as were the direction and performances.

See also 
 List of lost films

References

External links 

 
 
 
 
 
 Stranded at SilentEra
 Film still

1916 drama films
1916 lost films
1916 films
American black-and-white films
Silent American drama films
American silent feature films
Films directed by Lloyd Ingraham
Lost American films
Lost drama films
1910s American films